Wu Zhen (1280–1354 C.E.) was a Chinese painter during the Yuan Dynasty. He was best known for being one of the Four Masters of the Yuan.

Biography 
He was born in Weitang (now known as Chengguan). Most of his family is unknown.

Zhen graduated being educated in philosophy and swordsmanship. Shortly after his graduation, he chose to become a painter. His paintings did not sell well, but he had close friends who taught him how to paint, including Wu Guan, Zhang Guan, and Tao Zhongyi.

Artworks 
Many of Zhen's artworks were landscape paintings and paintings of bamboo. He also occasionally inserted poems into his artworks, which also helped him become better at calligraphy, poetry and artwork simultaneously.

References

External links
Landscapes Clear and Radiant: The Art of Wang Hui (1632–1717), an exhibition catalog from The Metropolitan Museum of Art (fully available online as PDF), which contains material on Wu Zhen (see index)

1280 births
1354 deaths
14th-century Chinese painters
Artists from Jiaxing
Painters from Zhejiang
Yuan dynasty painters